Mateo Kovačić (born 6 May 1994) is a Croatian professional footballer who plays as a midfielder for Premier League club Chelsea and the Croatia national team.

Kovačić began his professional career with Dinamo Zagreb at the age of 16, with whom he won two consecutive league titles, before joining Inter Milan in 2013. After the 2014–15 season, he moved to Real Madrid, where he won the 2015–16, 2016–17 and 2017–18 Champions Leagues. He joined Chelsea on one-year loan in 2018, signing permanently for the London club at the end of the season. With Chelsea, Kovačić won the 2018–19 Europa League and the 2020–21 Champions League, as well as the Chelsea Player of the Year after the 2019–20 season.

A full Croatian international since 2013, Kovačić represented the nation at the 2014, 2018 and 2022 FIFA World Cups, as well as the UEFA Euro 2016 and 2020, reaching the final of the 2018 tournament. He was nicknamed Il Professore (The Professor) by the Italian sports journalists.

Club career

Youth career
Kovačić began playing at an early age at the local LASK Linz's academy. In 2007, when Kovačić was 13, he was spotted by scouts from several prominent European clubs, including Ajax, Inter Milan, Juventus and Bayern Munich, but his family opted to move to Zagreb instead, where he joined the academy of Croatian giants Dinamo Zagreb.
Kovačić suffered a serious injury in 2009 in which his leg was broken, but he returned to the pitch after a lengthy recovery on 31 May 2010, appearing in the last match of the Croatian under-17 academy league, in a friendly 5–0 win against RNK Split under-17s.

Dinamo Zagreb
Kovačić started training with the club's senior squad under manager, Vahid Halilhodžić, four months later, on 6 October 2010, but continued to appear for the club in academy league matches during October. Later that month, it was reported by the local sports daily, Sportske novosti, that Arsenal's chief scout, Steve Rowley, had arrived in Zagreb to watch him perform in under-17 matches against Cibalia and Zagreb.

Kovačić eventually had his professional league debut in the 2010–11 Prva HNL away match against Hrvatski Dragovoljac on 20 November 2010, in which he scored Dinamo's fourth goal in their 6–0 win. This made him the youngest goalscorer in the history of the league, at the age of 16 years and 198 days, breaking the record set only a week earlier by Dino Špehar who had scored for Osijek at the age of 16 years and 278 days on 13 November 2010. In his first senior season with Dinamo Zagreb he managed to appear in 7 matches, making a contribution in winning the league title.

In the 2011–12 season, Kovačić rapidly established himself as a first team regular. He played mainly in the position of left midfielder in 4–2–3–1 system. In the beginning of the season, he helped the team reach the group stage of the season's Champions League for the first time in 12 years. Being only 17 years old, he appeared in the starting lineup of Dinamo's first group match against Real Madrid. He finished his first European season with Dinamo by scoring a goal against Lyon in the last game of the group stage in Zagreb and thus became the second youngest ever scorer in the Champions League. In the domestic league, he was a regular starter, appearing in 25 league matches and scoring five goals in the process. During a league match against Lučko, he became the youngest player to wear the captain's armband in Dinamo's history, taking the captaincy from Leandro Cufré. It was another successful season for him in domestic competitions as he appeared in 32 domestic league and cup matches during that season, helping Dinamo to win their seventh consecutive league title. He also scored in the Croatian Cup Final against Osijek at Stadion Maksimir. In December 2011, he was named Croatian Football Hope of the Year.

In the beginning of 2012–13 season, he suffered a metatarsal bone injury that caused him to miss several games on the club's qualifying road to another Champions League. He returned just in time to play in Dinamo's first Champions League game against Porto. Kovačić played in all six Dinamo Zagreb's matches in the 2012–13 UEFA Champions League group stage, against Porto, Paris Saint-Germain and Dynamo Kyiv. He continued to impress with his mature performances at a young age during the first half of the season. In October 2012, he was nominated for Golden Boy, an award given by sports journalists to a young player from Europe perceived to have been the most impressive during a season. During the season's winter break, Dinamo's board threw away the speculations about Kovačić leaving the club in the near future by saying they are building a new team around him and another rising star, Alen Halilović. However, on 30 January 2013, the media surprisingly revealed Kovačić was sold to Italian Serie A club Inter Milan.

During his time with Dinamo, Kovačić won two domestic league titles and two Croatian Cup titles, appearing in a total of 73 official matches, including 12 appearances in the UEFA Champions League.

Inter Milan

On 31 January 2013, Kovačić agreed to a transfer to Inter Milan. It was revealed the deal was worth €15 million in total, with €11 million paid immediately and €4 million when and if Inter qualifies for the UEFA Champions League. Upon his arrival, Kovačić was given the number 10 shirt, previously worn by Wesley Sneijder.

2012–13 season
Kovačić made his Inter Milan debut three days later on 3 February, coming on as a half-time substitute in a Serie A match against Siena. On 14 February, Kovačić made his European debut before the home crowd at San Siro in UEFA Europa League match against CFR Cluj. He provided the winning assist for Rodrigo Palacio, who made it 2–0 for Inter, impressing the crowd with his performance, and was given standing ovations while being substituted off in the 89th minute. He also played full 90 minutes in the 3–0 away win against CFR Cluj as Inter proceeded to the next round of the 2012–13 UEFA Europa League.

Kovačić made his first domestic league start for Inter in the next round of Serie A in a 1–4 away loss against Fiorentina. In the round of 16 of the UEFA Europa League, Inter was drawn to play against Tottenham Hotspur. After a 3–0 loss in London, Inter needed a 4–0 win in Milan to proceed to the next round. The match ended in a 4–1 win for Inter after the match went into extra time, with Kovačić playing as a starter. He impressed with his composure and playmaking ability, once again receiving ovations by the fans. Then-Inter manager Andrea Stramaccioni hailed his performances on several occasions, describing him as a "star for the future".

On 30 March, Kovačić was a starter in his first Derby d'Italia against Juventus at San Siro. The derby ended in a 1–2 win for Juventus, with Kovačić starting the action that resulted in Rodrigo Palacio's 1–1 equalizer. Kovačić was a starter in Inter's next Serie A match, a 0–2 away win against Sampdoria, as well as in their surprising 3–4 loss to Atalanta at San Siro, where he provided an assist for Ricky Álvarez's goal. By the end of the second half of the season, he was a starter in all of the club's Serie A fixtures, as Inter finished in disappointing ninth place on the Serie A table. In May, he was given the "Gentleman Revelation of the Year" award, awarded by Inter fans.

2013–14 season
Kovačić missed most of the pre-season training with the squad due to series of small injuries, and made his comeback just few days before the first official match of the new season, a Coppa Italia match against Cittadella at Stadio Giuseppe Meazza. During the pre-season interviews, new Inter manager Walter Mazzarri hinted Kovačić would be given a new role on the pitch, a role similar to Marek Hamšík's in Napoli. During the first half of the season, Kovačić played regularly, although he struggled with adjusting to his new tactical role. Kovačić made his first assist of the season in the match against Livorno, when he delivered an assist for Yuto Nagatomo. Unlike the previous season under manager Andrea Stramaccioni, Kovačić was not a regular starter during the 2013–14 season. In 32 Serie A matches played, he started only 14, playing the entire 90 minutes on just eight occasions. He received the chance to restore his confidence towards the end of the season, as he was Mazzarri's first-choice in the midfield in Inter's last six matches. On 10 May, in Javier Zanetti's last competitive match at the San Siro, Kovačić made three assists in 4–1 victory over Lazio.

2014–15 season
After being subjected to persistent transfer speculation over the summer, in September 2014, Kovačić was offered a contract extension until 2019. He started the season in strong fashion, scoring a hat-trick in the second leg of Europa League play-off round against Stjarnan on 28 August. He scored his first league goal for Inter and assisted twice in a 7–0 win over Sassuolo on 14 September 2014. He scored the club's only goal in a 1–1 away draw with Palermo. He also scored the opening goal in a 2–0 win against Chievo and scored a wonder goal in a 2–2 drawn against Lazio. On 6 January 2015, he was sent-off in a 1–1 draw with Juventus for a foul on Stephan Lichtsteiner. Three days later, Kovačić renewed his contract with Inter until June 2019.

Real Madrid

On 16 August 2015, Inter manager Roberto Mancini confirmed the club was forced to sell Kovačić to Real Madrid due to Financial Fair Play regulations. Speaking during a press conference after a friendly against Greek club AEK Athens, Mancini said, "There are rules that have to be respected. I don't think anyone wanted this to happen but we have the Financial Fair Play regulations to follow. We're all sorry about it: myself, the president, the management and the players themselves". Real Madrid also confirmed the transfer two days later, announcing Kovačić had signed a six-year contract with the club. The transfer fee was €29 million, according to Inter's financial filing in the section Management Report. On 19 August, Kovačić was unveiled as a new player by Real Madrid at the Santiago Bernabéu Stadium, where it was revealed he would wear the number 16 shirt for the club. Kovačić became the fifth Croatian player, after Robert Prosinečki, Davor Šuker, Robert Jarni and Luka Modrić, to join Real Madrid.

Four days after his presentation, he made his debut as a 70th-minute substitute for Isco as Real Madrid began the Liga season with a goalless draw at promoted Sporting de Gijón. He scored his first goal in an 8–0 home win over Malmö FF on 8 December 2015. On 3 January 2016, Kovačić received a straight red card in a 2–2 draw at Valencia for a foul on João Cancelo. Until the end of his first season with Los Blancos, he made a total of 34 appearances. In the opening months of the season, he was used quite regularly by then Real Madrid manager Rafael Benítez, playing in almost every midfield position there is – sometimes central, sometimes wide, sometimes further forward. However, after Zinedine Zidane replaced Benítez in early January, Kovačić's appearances became increasingly infrequent. With the Frenchman preferring to use a very defined starting 11 whenever possible instead of the more specific-lineups-for-specific-opponents approach employed by his predecessor, there was little room for Kovačić. He made eight appearances and scored one goal en Real Madrid's route to the 2015–16 UEFA Champions League title.

Kovačić scored his first Liga goal on 29 January 2017 in a 3–0 win over Real Sociedad. He was a part-time starter when Madrid won the 2016–17 La Liga and the 2016–17 UEFA Champions League.

During the 2017–18 UEFA Champions League, Kovačić made six appearances when Madrid won their third consecutive—and 13th overall—UEFA Champions League title.

Chelsea
On 8 August 2018, Kovačić joined Chelsea on a one-year loan. He made his debut in a 3–2 home win against Arsenal on 18 August, appearing as a second-half substitute. On 29 May 2019, he was named a starter for 2019 UEFA Europa League Final in Baku, playing until 78th minute when he was substituted off for Ross Barkley, as Chelsea defeated Arsenal 4–1.

On 1 July, Kovačić completed a permanent transfer to Chelsea, signing a five-year contract. After an underwhelming season under Maurizio Sarri, he turned into one of the most important Chelsea players under new coach Frank Lampard. Kovačić scored his first goal for Chelsea on 27 November, in a 2–2 Champions League draw against Valencia at Mestalla Stadium. On 7 December, he scored his first Premier League goal in a 1–3 away loss to Everton. In the 2020 FA Cup Final on 1 August 2020, he was controversially sent off for a rather soft challenge on Granit Xhaka, as Chelsea lost 2–1 to Arsenal. On 25 August, he was named the Chelsea Player of the Year.

On 23 September 2020, Kovačić marked his 100th appearance for the club against Barnsley in the third round of the EFL Cup as Chelsea won 6–0 at home. After a rougher start of the season, Kovačić regained form from the previous season following the appointment of new manager Thomas Tuchel. Ahead of the second leg of the Champions League quarter-final against Porto, Kovačić sustained a tendon injury and was forced to miss the semi-final tie against his former club Real Madrid, which Chelsea won 3–1 on aggregate. Despite previously winning three Champions Leagues, on 29 May 2021, Kovačić played in a Champions League Final for the first time in his career, coming on for Mason Mount in the 80th minute, as Chelsea defeated Manchester City 1–0.

Ahead of the 2021–22 season, Kovačić switched from his number 17 shirt to the number 8 shirt, most prominently worn by the club legend Frank Lampard. On 11 September 2021, he provided Romelu Lukaku with an assist and scored in a 3–0 victory over Aston Villa. In late October, Kovačić suffered an injury in training and then tested positive for COVID-19 upon recovery from it in early December. He returned to the team on 19 December, in a goalless draw with Wolverhampton Wanderers. On 2 January 2022, he initiated a comeback in a 2–2 home draw with Liverpool; he scored Chelsea's first goal while they were two goals down. He later won the Premier League Goal of the Month and the Chelsea Goal of the Season for this goal. Six days later, on 8 January, Kovačić captained Chelsea for the first time in a 5–1 victory over Chesterfield in the FA Cup.

On 7 March 2023, Kovačić captained Chelsea in the Champions League round of 16, leading them to a 2–0 victory over Borussia Dortmund and into the quarter-finals. Four days later, on 11 March, Kovačić captained Chelsea again and scored the third goal in a Premier League 3–1 victory over Leicester City.

International career

Kovačić appeared for the Croatian national team at various youth levels, debuting in May 2008 in an under-14 friendly match against Slovakia. Since 2011, he was a regular member of the Croatia under-19 and under-21 teams. In August 2012, Kovačić received his first competitive call-up for the Croatian senior team match against Switzerland, but did not play because of injury. Subsequently, he received a call up for 2014 FIFA World Cup qualification matches in March 2013. He made his senior debut in a qualification match against Serbia on 22 March 2013, playing as a central midfielder alongside Luka Modrić, instead of a regular team starter, Ognjen Vukojević. Four days later, he played against Wales at the Liberty Stadium, coming on as a second-half substitute in a 1–2 win. His third match of the campaign came in June, when Croatia faced Scotland in Zagreb and suffered a frustrating defeat as they were unable to score despite a string of good chances. By the end of the qualifiers, Kovačić made two more competitive appearances for Croatia, as Croatia scraped into the FIFA World Cup play-offs having taken only one point from their last four qualifiers. Although he didn't participate in the scoreless first leg of the play-off against Iceland in Reykjavík, Kovačić started the second and decisive leg between the two national teams in Zagreb, making an assist for the team's second goal as they reached the 2014 FIFA World Cup finals 2–0 on aggregate.

On 2 June 2014, Kovačić was confirmed as a member of Niko Kovač's World Cup squad. He was in Croatia's starting team for the opening game of the tournament, a 3–1 defeat to World Cup hosts Brazil at the Arena Corinthians, São Paulo, where he played for his team for 60 minutes before being substituted. He went to play all the remaining games in the group stage, as Croatia was eliminated in the group stage. On 7 June 2015, he scored his first international goal in a 4–0 victory over Gibraltar, coming in his 20th appearance for the team.

On 4 June 2018, Kovačić was selected in Zlatko Dalić's 23-man squad for the 2018 FIFA World Cup. On 22 June, Kovačić provided an assist to his teammate Ivan Rakitić as he scored Croatia's third goal in a 3–0 win over Argentina in their second group stage match of the tournament. Croatia was beaten 4–2 by France in the final on 15 July.

Kovačić appeared in Croatia's Nations League matches against Spain away and England home, that ended up as 6–0 defeat and a goalless draw, respectively. He featured throughout Croatia's successful Euro 2020 qualifying campaign, as they finished top of the group. In a 2–1 win over Wales in Osijek on 8 June 2019, he scored what would have been a goal for 2–0, however it was disallowed as Andrej Kramarić was in an offside position. In a return leg on 13 October, in the build-up to Wales' goal, Kovačić was controversially injured by Ben Davies as the match ended up as a 1–1 draw.

During 2020–21 Nations League, Kovačić was heavily criticized for his inefficiency in the national team, especially after making an error that led to Dejan Kuluševski's opening goal in Croatia's crucial match against Sweden on 14 November 2020, that eventually finished as a 2–1 defeat. However, three days later, he scored a brace in a 3–2 defeat to Portugal, which eventually saved Croatia from relegation to League B as they achieved better goal difference than Sweden.

On 17 May 2021, Kovačić was selected in Dalić's 26-man squad for the UEFA Euro 2020 and started all three group stage matches. In stark contrast to Croatia's Nations League campaign, his performances earned him widespread praise in the country as Croatia finished as the group runners-up and went through to the Round of 16. On 3 June 2022, in a 3–0 Nations League defeat to Austria, Kovačić captained Croatia for the first time. At the 2022 FIFA World Cup, Kovačić received further praise for his performances as Croatia finished in third place.

Style of play

Kovačić has been described as a great technician with excellent dribbling abilities. He is considered to be a versatile midfielder, having played in different midfield positions. He started off as an attacking midfielder at Dinamo Zagreb, but he transformed his game at Inter where he was deployed out wide and also as a central midfielder, functioning as a deep-lying playmaker, while being coached by Andrea Stramaccioni. One of his trademarks is dropping deep to receive the ball and then driving forward, often performing his slalom runs. Under the coach, Walter Mazzarri, he was often used in a more advanced position. Former manager Giovanni Trapattoni once claimed that Kovačić knows how to really reach the ball from deep and drive up the pitch like a 'raging bull'. Proven by his pass completion percentages, Kovačić is known for distributing the ball up the pitch.

Reception
The Croatia under-17 manager, Martin Novoselac, reportedly said of Kovačić, "I haven't seen a youngster with so much talent since the days of Robert Prosinečki," referring to his fast development and talent. Kovačić revealed that precisely Prosinečki is the player he admired the most while growing up. His compatriot, Zvonimir Boban, who played for Milan for over a decade, in an interview with Sky Italia in 2013 said, "He has talents that could make him even better than me, he is an incredibly serious professional for someone his age. Kovačić is a complete player. He is not a born regista but he is playing there now. He is a complete talent that can still grow — he has incredible potential." Trapattoni described him as "a mixture of Kaká and Clarence Seedorf", because of his style of play and technical characteristics. Long-time Inter captain Javier Zanetti stated that, with the exception of Ronaldo, who had arrived to Inter when he was 21, Kovačić was the most promising youngster he had seen in his 19 years at the club.

Personal life
Kovačić was born in Linz, Austria, to Bosnian Croat parents Stipo and Ružica who had moved there from Zabrđe near Kotor Varoš, Bosnia and Herzegovina ahead of the Yugoslav Wars.

He is a devout Roman Catholic and he attends church every Sunday. He speaks five languages: Croatian, German, English, Italian and Spanish. He named Luka Modrić his football idol.

In 2017, Kovačić married his longtime girlfriend Izabel Andrijanić. On 12 October 2020, Andrijanić gave birth to their first child, a baby boy named Ivan. The child was christened in July 2021, with Luka Modrić being his godfather.

He made a cameo appearance in Jakov Sedlar's 2021 film The Match, alongside Croatia teammate Dejan Lovren.

Career statistics

Club

International

Scores and results list Croatia's goal tally first, score column indicates score after each Kovačić goal.

Honours
Dinamo Zagreb
Prva HNL: 2010–11, 2011–12
Croatian Cup: 2010–11, 2011–12

Real Madrid
La Liga: 2016–17
Supercopa de España: 2017
UEFA Champions League: 2015–16, 2016–17, 2017–18
UEFA Super Cup: 2016, 2017
FIFA Club World Cup: 2016, 2017

Chelsea
UEFA Champions League: 2020–21
UEFA Europa League: 2018–19
UEFA Super Cup: 2021
FIFA Club World Cup: 2021
FA Cup runner-up: 2019–20, 2021–22
EFL Cup runner-up: 2018–19, 2021–22

Croatia
FIFA World Cup runner-up: 2018; third place: 2022

Individual
Croatian Football Hope of the Year: 2011
Chelsea Player of the Year: 2019–20
Chelsea Goal of the Season: 2021–22
Premier League Goal of the Month: January 2022

Orders
Order of Duke Branimir: 2018

References

External links

Profile at the Chelsea F.C. website

1994 births
Living people
Footballers from Linz
Croatian footballers
Association football midfielders
GNK Dinamo Zagreb players
Inter Milan players
Real Madrid CF players
Chelsea F.C. players
Croatian Football League players
Serie A players
La Liga players
Premier League players
FA Cup Final players
UEFA Champions League winning players
UEFA Europa League winning players
Croatia under-21 international footballers
Croatia international footballers
2014 FIFA World Cup players
UEFA Euro 2016 players
2018 FIFA World Cup players
UEFA Euro 2020 players
2022 FIFA World Cup players
Croatian expatriate footballers
Expatriate footballers in Italy
Expatriate footballers in Spain
Expatriate footballers in England
Croatian expatriate sportspeople in Italy
Croatian expatriate sportspeople in Spain
Croatian expatriate sportspeople in England
Croatian Roman Catholics